Brabant-en-Argonne (literally Brabant in Argonne) is a commune in the Meuse department in Grand Est in northeastern France.

This commune was merged with Récicourt 1 January 1973. It was then re-established as a commune 1 January 2004.

Population

See also
Communes of the Meuse department

References

Communes of Meuse (department)